Gambia Cricket Association is the official governing body of the sport of cricket in the Gambia and operates the Gambia national cricket team. Its current headquarters is in Banjul, Gambia. Gambia Cricket Association is Gambia's representative at the International Cricket Council and is an associate member and has been a member of that body since 2002. It is also a member of the African Cricket Association.

References

External links
Cricinfo-Gambia

Cricket administration
Cricket
Cricket in the Gambia